Rules of Enragement is Lewis Black's third album as well as his first for Comedy Central Records. It was recorded at Acme Comedy Company in Minneapolis, Minnesota.

The title is a play on the military term, "Rules of engagement".

An LP edition of 500 was issued on clear blue vinyl by Stand Up! Records.

Track listing
"Minnesota Winters" – 3:00
"The Settling of Minnesota" – 3:32
"The Coldest Winter EVER!" – 3:05
"International Travel" – 3:27
"Ireland and Health" – 14:56
"Health Clubs" – 3:00
"Small Pox" – 1:59
"Greed" – 9:30
"Who's Fucking Who" – 4:48
"Homeland Security" – 3:47
"Bringing Democracy to Iraq" – 1:09
"The War in Iraq" – 10:45
"A Sense of Humor" – 2:48

Notes
In this album Black swears close to 200 times, an average of every 20 seconds, and says fuck close to 100 times, an average of every 40 seconds.

2003 albums
Lewis Black albums
Comedy Central Records albums
2000s comedy albums